Airey Middleton Sheffield Neave,  (23 January 1916 – 30 March 1979) was a British soldier, lawyer and Member of Parliament (MP) from 1953 until his assassination in 1979.

During World War II he was the first British prisoner-of-war to succeed in escaping from Oflag IV-C at Colditz Castle, and later worked for MI9. After the war he served with the International Military Tribunal at the Nuremberg trials. He later became Conservative MP for Abingdon.

Neave was assassinated in a car bomb attack at the House of Commons. The Irish National Liberation Army claimed responsibility.

Early life
Neave was the son of Sheffield Airey Neave CMG, OBE (1879–1961), an entomologist, who lived at Ingatestone, Essex, and his wife Dorothy, the daughter of Arthur Thomson Middleton. His father was the grandson of Sheffield Neave, the third son of Sir Thomas Neave, 2nd Baronet (see Neave baronets).

The family came to prominence as merchants in the West Indies during the 18th century and were raised to the baronetage during the life of Richard Neave, Governor of the Bank of England. Neave spent his early years in Knightsbridge in London, before he moved to Beaconsfield. Neave was sent to St. Ronan's School, Worthing, and from there, in 1929, he went to Eton College. He went on to read Jurisprudence at Merton College, Oxford.

While at Eton, Neave composed a prize-winning essay in 1933 that examined the likely consequences of Adolf Hitler's rise to supreme power in Germany, and Neave predicted then that another widespread war would break out in Europe in the near future. Neave had earlier been on a visit to Germany, and he witnessed the Nazi German methods of grasping political and military power. At Eton, Neave served in the school cadet corps as a cadet lance corporal, and received a territorial commission as a second lieutenant in the Oxfordshire and Buckinghamshire Light Infantry on 11 December 1935.

When Neave went to Oxford University, he purchased and read the entire written works of the writer Carl von Clausewitz. When Neave was asked why, he answered: "since war [is] coming, it [is] only sensible to learn as much as possible about the art of waging it". During 1938, Neave completed his third-class degree. By his own admission, while at Oxford University, he did only the minimum amount of academic work that was required of him by his tutors.

Second World War
Neave transferred his territorial commission to the Royal Engineers on 2 May 1938 and following the outbreak of war he was mobilised. Sent to France in February 1940 with 1st Searchlight Regiment, Royal Artillery, he was wounded and captured by the Germans at Calais on 23 May 1940. He was imprisoned at Oflag IX-A/H near Spangenberg and in February 1941 moved to Stalag XX-A near Thorn in German-occupied western Poland. Meanwhile, Neave's commission was transferred to the Royal Artillery on 1 August 1940.

In April 1941 he escaped from Thorn with Norman Forbes. They were captured near Ilow while trying to enter Soviet-controlled Poland and were briefly in the hands of the Gestapo. In May, they were both sent to Oflag IV-C (often referred to as Colditz Castle because of its location).

While in Colditz, the French military prisoners asked the German to have the Jewish military prisoners separated from the gentile French military prisoners, which resulted in about 80 French Jewish military prisoners being confined in a crowded attic of the castle. Neave and many British officers were appalled at the French prisoners for this request.  In demonstration of their solidarity with the French Jews, the British invited the French Jews to dinner in the British mess, where Neave made a speech denouncing the prejudice. 

Neave made his first attempt to escape from Colditz on 28 August 1941 disguised as a German NCO. He did not get out of the castle as his hastily contrived German uniform (made from a Polish army tunic and cap painted with scenery paint) was rendered bright green under the prison searchlights. Together with Dutch officer Anthony Luteyn he made a second attempt on 5 January 1942, again in disguise.

Better uniforms and escape route (they made a quick exit from a theatrical production using the trap door beneath the stage) got them out of the prison and by train and on foot they travelled to Leipzig and Ulm and finally reached the border to Switzerland near Singen. Via France, Spain and Gibraltar, Neave returned to England in April 1942. Neave was the first British officer to escape from Colditz Castle. On 12 May 1942, shortly after his return to England, he was decorated with the Military Cross. He was subsequently promoted to war substantive captain and to the permanent rank of captain on 11 April 1945. A temporary major at the war's end, he was appointed an MBE (Military Division) on 30 August 1945, and awarded the DSO on 18 October. As a result, the earlier MBE appointment was cancelled on 25 October 1945.

After his escape from the Germans, Neave was recruited as an intelligence officer for MI9, supporting underground escape organizations, such as the Pat O'Leary Line and Comet Line in occupied Europe, with equipment, agents, and money; assisting downed Allied airmen and other Allied military personnel evade and escape capture by the Germans. In Western Europe, about 5,000 British and American military personnel were rescued by the escape organizations and repatriated to the United Kingdom, mostly through neutral Spain, before D-Day. After D-Day in Operation Marathon, Neave journeyed to France and Belgium and, with help from the Comet Line and the Resistance, rescued more than 300 allied airmen who had taken refuge in forest camps after being shot down. While at MI9, he was the immediate superior of the future comedian Michael Bentine, also an Old Etonian.

He also served with the International Military Tribunal at the Nuremberg trials, investigating Krupp. He was supported by the work of his secretary Joan Tutte. As a well-known war hero – as well as a qualified lawyer who spoke fluent German – he was honoured with the role of reading the indictments to the Nazi leaders on trial. He wrote several books about his war experiences including an account of the trials.

A temporary lieutenant-colonel by 1947, he was appointed an OBE (Military Division) in that year's Birthday Honours. He was awarded the Bronze Star by the US government on 20 July 1948, and was promoted to lieutenant-colonel on 1 April 1950, At the same time, his promotion to acting major was gazetted, with retroactive effect from 16 April 1948. He entered the reserves on 21 September 1951.

Political career
Neave stood for the Conservative Party at the 1950 election in Thurrock and at Ealing North in 1951. He was elected for Abingdon in a by-election in June 1953, but his career was held back by a heart attack he suffered in 1959.

He was a Governor of Imperial College between 1963 and 1971 and was a member of the House of Commons select committee on Science and Technology between 1965 and 1970. He was on the governing body of Abingdon School from 1953 to 1979.

Edward Heath, when Chief Whip, was alleged to have told Neave that after he suffered his heart attack his career was finished but in his 1998 autobiography, Heath strongly denied ever making such a remark. He admitted that in December 1974 Neave had told him to stand down for the good of the party. During the final two months of 1974, Neave had asked Keith Joseph, William Whitelaw and Edward du Cann to stand against Heath, and said that in the case of any of them challenging for the party leadership, he would be their campaign manager. When all three refused to stand, Neave agreed to be the campaign manager for Margaret Thatcher's attempt to become leader of the Conservative Party, that was eventually successful.

When Thatcher was elected leader in February 1975, Neave was rewarded by becoming head of her private office. He was then appointed Shadow Secretary of State for Northern Ireland and, at the time of his death, was poised to attain the equivalent Cabinet position in the event of the Conservatives winning the general election of 1979. In opposition, Neave was a strong supporter of Roy Mason, who had extended the policy of Ulsterisation.

Neave was author of the new and radical Conservative policy of abandoning devolution in Northern Ireland if there was no early progress in that regard, and concentrating on local government reform instead. This integrationist policy was hastily abandoned by Humphrey Atkins, who became Secretary of State for Northern Ireland, the role Neave had shadowed.

Politician Tony Benn records in his diary (17 February 1981) that a journalist from the New Statesman, Duncan Campbell, told him that he had received information two years previously, from an intelligence agent, that Neave had planned to have Benn assassinated if, following the election of Labour government, Labour leader James Callaghan resigned and there was a possibility that Benn might be elected in his place.

Campbell said that the agent was ready to give his name and the New Statesman was going to print the story. Benn, however, discounted the validity of the story, writing in his diary: "No one will believe for a moment that Airey Neave would have done such a thing." The magazine printed the story on 20 February 1981, naming the agent as Lee Tracey. Tracey said he had met Neave, who asked him to join a team of intelligence and security specialists which would "make sure Benn was stopped". A planned second meeting never took place because Neave was murdered with a car bomb.

Assassination

Airey Neave was critically wounded on 30 March 1979 when a car bomb fitted with a tilt-switch exploded under his Vauxhall Cavalier at 14:58 as he drove out of the Palace of Westminster car park. He lost both legs in the explosion and died of his wounds at Westminster Hospital an hour after being rescued from the wrecked car. He was 63.

The Irish National Liberation Army (INLA) afterwards claimed responsibility for the assassination. Neave had been pressing within Conservative Party circles and in Parliament throughout the Troubles for the British Government to abandon its strategy of containment (including "Ulsterisation") of Irish republican paramilitarism within Northern Ireland, and switch to one of pursuing its military defeat.  It is believed that this is what led to his being targeted.

Following his death, Conservative leader Margaret Thatcher said of Neave:

Labour Prime Minister James Callaghan said: "No effort will be spared to bring the murderers to justice and to rid the United Kingdom of the scourge of terrorism."

The INLA issued a statement regarding the murder in the August 1979 edition of The Starry Plough:

Neave's death came two days after the vote of no confidence which brought down Callaghan's government and a few weeks before the general election, which brought about a Conservative victory and saw Thatcher come to power as Prime Minister. Neave's wife Diana, whom he married on 29 December 1942, was subsequently elevated to the House of Lords as Baroness Airey of Abingdon.

Neave's biographer Paul Routledge met a member of the Irish Republican Socialist Party (the political wing of INLA) who was involved in the killing of Neave and who told Routledge that Neave "would have been very successful at that job [Northern Ireland Secretary]. He would have brought the armed struggle to its knees".

As a result of Neave's assassination the INLA was declared illegal across the whole of the United Kingdom on 2 July 1979.

Neave was buried in the graveyard of St. Margaret's Church at Hinton Waldrist, in Oxfordshire.

Fictional portrayal of murder
In 2014, 35 years after Neave's death, a fictionalised account of Neave's murder was depicted in the Channel 4 drama Utopia, where he is portrayed as a drinker who colluded with spies and whose assassination was perpetrated by MI5. This led to condemnation of the broadcaster, with Norman Tebbit, a friend and political colleague of Neave, saying "To attack a man like that who is dead and cannot defend himself is despicable".

Media depictions
Neave was portrayed by Geoffrey Pounsett in Nuremberg (2000), Dermot Crowley in Margaret (2009), Nicholas Farrell in The Iron Lady (2011) (in a piece of dramatic licence Thatcher is shown in that film as an eyewitness to his death) and Tim McInnerny in Utopia (2014).

Works
 1953 – They Have Their Exits
 1954 – Little Cyclone
 1969 – Saturday at MI9 (U.S. title: The Escape Room)
 1972 – The Flames of Calais: A Soldier's Battle, 1940
 1978 – Nuremberg (U.S. title: On Trial at Nuremberg)

References

Further reading

External links 
 
 Airey Neave Trust
 Margaret Thatcher speech at Neave's memorial service in 1979
 Parliamentary Archives, Papers of Airey Middleton Sheffield Neave (1916-1979) 

1916 births
1979 deaths
1979 in London
Military personnel from London
1979 murders in the United Kingdom
Alumni of Merton College, Oxford
Assassinated British MPs
Assassinated English politicians
British Army personnel of World War II
British World War II prisoners of war
British campaign managers
Companions of the Distinguished Service Order
Conservative Party (UK) MPs for English constituencies
Conspiracy theories
Deaths by car bomb in England
English escapees
English terrorism victims
Escapees from German detention
Governors of Abingdon School
Male murder victims
Members of the Middle Temple
Ministers in the Macmillan and Douglas-Home governments, 1957–1964
Officers of the Order of the British Empire
People educated at Eton College
People from Beaconsfield
People from Knightsbridge
People killed by the Irish National Liberation Army
People murdered in Westminster
Prisoners of war held at Colditz Castle
Recipients of the Military Cross
Royal Artillery officers
Spouses of life peers
Terrorism deaths in England
Terrorist incidents in the United Kingdom in 1979
UK MPs 1951–1955
UK MPs 1955–1959
UK MPs 1959–1964
UK MPs 1964–1966
UK MPs 1966–1970
UK MPs 1970–1974
UK MPs 1974
UK MPs 1974–1979
20th-century British businesspeople